KXNM is a non-commercial community radio station licensed to Encino, New Mexico and serving mainly Torrance County and other communities in Central New Mexico known as the Estancia Valley. KXNM's studios are located in the town of McIntosh, New Mexico.

The station broadcasts an 18,000 watt signal at 88.7 MHz.

KXNM previously featured an extraordinarily eclectic music format comprising several genres including adult contemporary, country, smooth jazz, classical and oldies, among others. KXNM also provided community information concerning the local areas not frequently mentioned on near-by Albuquerque area stations. 

On August 8, 2022, KXNM announced on their Facebook page that the local format had come to an end and Albuquerque public radio station KANW would take over the operations and programming of KXNM. Currently the station is re-broadcasting KANW.

References

External links

XNM